Sheri Everts is an American academic and educator serving as the chancellor of Appalachian State University in North Carolina.

Early life and education 
Born and raised in Nebraska, Everts attended elementary school in a one-room schoolhouse. She completed her undergraduate education at the University of Nebraska–Lincoln, graduating with a Bachelor of Arts degree in English in 1980. She worked as a high school English teacher in Nebraska and Kansas for several years, later returning to UNL to complete an Master of Arts in literacy education and Doctor of Education.

Career 
In 1994, Everts joined the University of Nebraska Omaha as an assistant professor in the Department of Teacher Education. She was made assistant vice-chancellor for academic and student affairs in 2000, associate vice-president in 2003, and interim senior vice-chancellor in 2006. Everts left UNO in 2008 to become provost and vice-president for academic affairs at Illinois State University. She served as interim president from May to August 2013, following the resignation of Alvin Bowman. In March 2014, Everts was announced as the new chancellor of Appalachian State University. She took office in July 2014, and was formally installed April 2015  as the university's first female chancellor.

Criticism 
On August 17, 2020, the Appalachian State Faculty Senate voted no confidence in Chancellor's Everts' leadership because of concerns about teaching during the COVID-19 pandemic.  . Appalachian State was one of the largest UNC System schools to hold in-person classes throughout 2020, with 30 percent in-person classes, 30 percent hybrid classes and 40 percent remote/online classes.

References

Appalachian State University faculty
University of Nebraska alumni
University of Nebraska Omaha faculty
Teachers of English
Illinois State University faculty
Women heads of universities and colleges
Heads of universities and colleges in the United States
American academic administrators
Living people
Year of birth missing (living people)
Schoolteachers from Nebraska
American women academics
21st-century American women